Lewis Hampton (1901 – death unknown) was an American Negro league pitcher in the 1920s. 

Hampton made his Negro leagues debut in 1921 with the Atlanta Black Crackers of the Negro Southern League. He went on to play for several teams, finishing his career with a three-year stint with the Detroit Stars from 1925 to 1927.

References

External links
 and Seamheads

1901 births
Date of birth missing
Year of death missing
Place of birth missing
Place of death missing
Bacharach Giants players
Columbus Buckeyes (Negro leagues) players
Detroit Stars players
Hilldale Club players
Indianapolis ABCs players
Washington Potomacs players
Wilmington Potomacs players
Baseball pitchers

Atlanta Black Crackers players